Iroquois Township may refer to the following townships in the United States:

 Iroquois Township, Newton County, Indiana
 Iroquois Township, Iroquois County, Illinois